Casuarina junghuhniana, the mountain ru or red-tipped ru, is a she-oak species of the genus Casuarina that originated in Java and Lesser Sunda Islands. The species has been introduced to Pakistan and Bangladesh.

Description 
Casuarina junghuhniana is an evergreen tree growing to 15–35 m (50–115 ft) tall. The foliage consists of slender, much-branched green to grey-green twigs 0.8–1 mm (0.032–0.039 in) diameter, bearing minute scale-leaves in whorls of 9–11. It is dioecious and The flowers are produced in small catkin-like inflorescences. The fruit is an oval woody structure, superficially resembling a conifer cone made up of numerous carpels each containing a single seed with a small wing 4–5 mm (0.16–0.2 in) long. Unlike Casuarina equisetifolia, Mountain Ru (C. junghuhniana) has a narrower canopy, small and neat branches. It has a straight and knotless trunk.

Like some other species of the genus Casuarina, C. junghuhniana is an actinorhizal plant able to fix atmospheric nitrogen. In contrast to species of the plant family Fabaceae (e.g., beans, alfalfa, Acacia), Casuarina harbours a symbiosis with a Frankia actinomycete.

Taxonomy 
There are two subspecies:

 Casuarina junghuhniana subsp. junghuhniana distributed in Java, Bali, Lombok, Sumbawa and Flores, Indonesia.
 Casuarina junghuhniana subsp. timorensis found in Timor Island, Wetar, Sumba and Sumbawa, Indonesia and Timor-Leste.

Distribution and habitat 
It is native to Java and Lesser Sunda islands, Indonesia.The species has been introduced to Pakistan and Bangladesh as a restoration of degraded forest areas.

Uses 
Popularly grown as an ornamental plant and a windproof line. The wood of this tree is used for shingles, fencing, and is said to make excellent hot-burning firewood.

References 

junghuhniana
Taxa named by Friedrich Anton Wilhelm Miquel
Dioecious plants